Gabriel Hernán Halaixt Buitrago (born 5 September 1943) is a Colombian former professional road cyclist.

Major results
1963
 1st  Road race, National Road Championships
 1st Stage 5 Vuelta a Colombia
1964
 1st  Overall Clásico RCN
1st  Mountains classification
1st Stage 2
 1st Stages 1 & 12 Vuelta a Colombia
1966
 6th Overall Clásico RCN
1968
 8th Overall Vuelta al Táchira
1st Sprints classification
1st Stage 5

References

External links

Colombian male cyclists
Living people
1943 births
Sportspeople from Santander Department
Vuelta a Colombia stage winners
20th-century Colombian people
21st-century Colombian people